, formerly Kyoto Gakuen University, is a private university located in Ukyō-ku, Kyoto, Japan. Originally founded as a trade school in 1925 and incorporated in 1969, KUAS was refounded in 2019 under the leadership of Shigenobu Nagamori. Its two campuses are located in Ukyō-ku, Kyoto City, and Kameoka City, Kyoto Prefecture.

The university is organized into five faculties and five graduate schools. The undergraduate faculties include the Faculty of Economics and Business Administration, the Faculty of Humanities, the Faculty of Bioenvironmental Science, the Faculty of Health and Medical Sciences, and the Faculty of Engineering. The graduate schools include the Graduate School of Economics, the Graduate School of Business Administration, the Graduate School of Human Culture, the Graduate School of Bioenvironmental Science, and the Graduate School of Engineering.

In 2020, the university's Faculty of Engineering began to offer programs taught entirely in English, signaling a shift towards internationalization and English-medium education.

References

External links
 Official website

Educational institutions established in 1925
Private universities and colleges in Japan
Universities and colleges in Kyoto
Kansai Collegiate American Football League
1925 establishments in Japan
Kameoka, Kyoto